Make Me Like a Child Again is a studio album by American recording artist Wanda Jackson. It was released in March 1976 via Myrrh Records and contained ten tracks. The disc was Jackson's twenty fourth studio album and her fourth to consist entirely of gospel songs. One single was issued from the album in 1975 titled "Touring That City".

Background and content
Before her gospel material, Wanda Jackson reached commercial success in the Rockabilly and country music fields with singles like "Let's Have a Party" and "Right Wrong". After dedicating her life to Christianity in 1971, Jackson left her long-time label to record gospel (in combination with country music) for Word Records. Among her gospel releases was Make Me Like a Child Again. The project was recorded in the fall of 1975 at the Creative Workshop, a studio located in Nashville, Tennessee. Sessions were produced by Billy Ray Hearn. A total of ten gospel recordings comprised the album. Among these tracks were covers of "Victory in Jesus", "Lord I'm Coming Home", Marilyn Sellars' "One Day at a Time" and Bill Gaither's "Because He Lives".

Release and singles
Make Me Like a Child Again was released on Myrrh Records in March 1976. It was Jackson's twenty fourth studio collection released in her career and her third Myrrh release. The album was distributed as a vinyl LP, containing five songs on either side of the record. It also was distributed as a cassette. The album failed to reach any Billboard chart positions, notably the Top Country Albums survey, which Jackson's albums often made appearances on. She would record several more gospel and country albums for the Word and Myrrh record labels during the 1970s. However, these albums lacked any commercial success. In her autobiography, Jackson reflected on the album's release and found that the record was "not very memorable" in comparison with her other gospel albums she released in her career. "Touring That City" was the only single that appeared on the album. It was first released on Myrrh in 1975.

Track listing

Personnel
All credits are adapted from the liner notes of Make Me Like a Child Again.

Musical personnel
 Kenny Buttrey – Drums
 Ray Edenton – Guitar
 Wanda Jackson – Lead vocals
 Sherry Kramer – Background vocals
 Weldon Myrick – Steel guitar
 Cindy Reynolds – Harp
 Billy Sanford – Guitar
 Lisa Silver – Background vocals
 Jerry Shook – Guitar
 Jack Williams – Bass
 Bergen White – Background vocals

Technical personnel
 Billy Ray Hearn – Producer
 Brent Maher – Engineering
 Bergen White – Arrangement

Release history

References

1976 albums
Wanda Jackson albums